Heidi Krings  (born 30 March 1983) is an Austrian snowboarder. She was born in Salzburg. She competed at the 2006 Winter Olympics, in parallel giant slalom.

References

External links 
 

1983 births
Living people
Sportspeople from Salzburg
Austrian female snowboarders
Olympic snowboarders of Austria
Snowboarders at the 2006 Winter Olympics
21st-century Austrian women